"Child in Time" is a song by English rock band Deep Purple, taken from their fourth studio album, Deep Purple in Rock, released in mid-1970. The track is loosely inspired by the Cold War and runs over ten minutes.

History and characteristics 
Ian Gillan said that the organ riff in "Child in Time" is based on It's a Beautiful Day's 1969 song "Bombay Calling". It's a Beautiful Day in return borrowed Purple's "Wring That Neck" and turned it into "Don and Dewey" on their second album Marrying Maiden (1970). The song started with organist Jon Lord playing "Bombay Calling", which the band then re-arranged and changed the structure. Gillan had never heard the original song, and created lyrics about the Cold War to fit the music, later saying it "reflected the mood of the moment". The band then worked out instrumental lines to accompany this.

With themes of war and inhumanity, the song is regarded as a heavy metal anthem and an example of art rock.

A staple of the Deep Purple live concerts in 1970–73 and later after their initial reunion tours of 1985 and 1987–88, the song was not featured regularly at concerts after 1995. It was re-added to the setlist for the band's 2002 European tour, with its final appearance in Deep Purple's live set was at Kharkiv's Opera Theatre's scene in March of that year.

A live version appeared on the 1972 live album Made in Japan. Other live versions can be found on the Scandinavian Nights/Live in Stockholm live album, recorded in September 1970 and the BBC recordings released as Deep Purple In Concert. Gillan also featured a live jazz influenced version of the song in his Ian Gillan Band project of the late 1970s on Live at the Budokan album.

A shortened version, with vocals by Candice Night and preceded and followed by their instrumental "Mond Tanz", appeared on the Blackmore's Night album The Village Lanterne.

Accolades 
"Child in Time" was ranked no. 1 on Radio Veronica's "Super All-Time List" in 1989. The song ranked at no. 16 in Guitarist'''s 1998 readers poll of Top 100 Guitar Solos of All-Time. English disc jockey John Peel's 1976 list of Festive Fifty featured the song at no. 25. It was second, third or fourth place for many years on the annual Dutch Top 2000 songs of all time.

 Covers and references in popular culture 
 Ian Gillan performed the song with his Ian Gillan Band on the 1976 album Child in Time.

 The song was covered by Yngwie Malmsteen for his 1996 album Inspiration.

The song was covered by Rata Blanca and Tarja in a show in Buenos Aires on 9 June 2009.

Anu Malik drew inspiration from this song for the opening and closing portions of Aisa Zakhm Diya from the Hindi film Akele Hum Akele Tum.

The studio version of the song is played by character Dusty (Philip Seymour Hoffman) during a driving montage in the 1996 film Twister. The live footage playing on his television is from Deep Purple's appearance at the California Jam in 1974, though Child In Time was not performed during this set.

The 2022 Netflix series 1899'' features the song in Episode 2 before the end credits roll.

See also 
List of anti-war songs
Deep Purple discography

References

External links 
  Video Clip of Deep Purple – Child In Time 1970  available under the open "Internet Archive" at "archive.org" using format of (JW Player)

1970 songs
1972 singles
Anti-war songs
Art rock songs
Deep Purple songs
Songs written by Ian Gillan
Songs written by Ian Paice
Songs written by Jon Lord
Songs written by Ritchie Blackmore
Songs written by Roger Glover
Songs involved in plagiarism controversies
Songs of the Vietnam War